Ikhupe Pass, Is situated in the KwaZulu-Natal province of South Africa, on the National road  N11 between Ladysmith and Newcastle.

References

Mountain passes of KwaZulu-Natal